Sarcodon ussuriensis is a species of tooth fungus in the family Bankeraceae. Taisiya Lvovna Nikolayeva described the species as new to science in 1961 from collections made in what was then called the USSR.

References

External links

Fungi described in 1961
Fungi of Europe
ussuriensis